Claude Catherine de Clermont-Tonnerre de Vivonne (1543 – 18 February 1603), lady of Dampierre, countess and duchess of Retz, was a French courtier, writer and salon host.

Life

Family and private life

Claude Catherine de Clermont was born in Paris, the only child of Claude de Clermont-Tonnerre and of Jeanne de Vivonne.  
In 1561, at 18, she married Jean d'Annebaut, but found herself widowed at 20 after he was killed in the battle of Dreux in 1563. 

In 1565, she married for a second time, to Albert de Gondi, duc de Retz. Their children included Henri Charles de Gondi (Duke of Retz, Count & Marquess of Belle-Isle, Lord of Perron, Marshall of France), Jean-François de Gondi (later archbishop of Paris) and Claude-Marguerite de Gondi (later Marquise de Maignelay and patroness of the Madelonnettes Convent).
During the absence of her spouse, she assembled troops at his expense to drive off robbers threatening his lands, led them herself and forced the robbers to take flight.

Court career

Beautiful and courteous, Catherine was made lady in waiting to queen Catherine de' Medici. She was later appointed Governess of the Children of France.

She spoke several living languages.  In 1573, when ambassadors from Poland came to see the duke of Anjou, she publicly replied to them in Latin on behalf of the queen-mother and her speech took on those of René de Birague and the comte de Cheverny, who replied on behalf of Charles IX and the duke of Anjou.

Cultural activity

She spoke Latin, Greek and several living languages. She acquired a great reputation as an intellectual, becoming known as the "10th Muse" and the "4th Grace".  The Croix du Maine wrote that: 
"she deserved to be in the first rank of those learned and well-versed in poetry, oratory, philosophy, mathematics, history and other sciences".  

Holding a salon and regularly attending the sittings of the Académie du Palais, she was also a patroness of the arts, supporting the foundation of Jean-Antoine de Baïf's Académie de musique et de poésie in 1570. 

She circulated her own writings mostly in manuscript, so that little of it has been preserved.

References

External links 

Official WebSite of the House of Clermont-Tonnerre : 
Claude Catherine De Clermont Biography: 

1543 births
1603 deaths
French countesses
French duchesses
16th-century French women writers
16th-century French writers
French salon-holders
Governesses to the Children of France
French ladies-in-waiting
Household of Catherine de' Medici